The 2014 Tippeligaen was the 70th completed season of top division football in Norway. The competition began on 28 March 2014, two weeks later than in the previous season. A three-week summer-break in June was scheduled due to the 2014 FIFA World Cup, and the decisive match was played on 9 November 2014. Strømsgodset were the defending champions. Bodø/Glimt and Stabæk joined as the promoted clubs from the 2013 1. divisjon. They replaced Tromsø and Hønefoss who were relegated to the 2014 1. divisjon.

Molde won their third title, with four matches to spare following a 2–1 away win against Viking on 4 October 2014. The team broke the record for most points (71) and most wins (22).

Overview

Summary
On 4 October, Molde were confirmed as league champions following their 2–1 away win against Viking in the 26th round. They won their third title. On 2 November, in the penultimate round of the season, Sandnes Ulf were the first team to be relegated to the 1. divisjon when they gave away a 3–1 lead in stoppage time and drew 3–3 away to Start. On the final day, Sogndal were relegated and Brann qualified for the relegation play-offs. On 26 November, Brann were the third team to be relegated after losing the play-offs 4–1 on aggregate against Mjøndalen.

Teams
The league was contested by 16 teams: the best 13 teams of the 2013 season, and the 14th-placed Sarpsborg 08 who won the relegation-playoffs against Ranheim, in addition to two promoted teams from 1. divisjon. The promoted teams were Bodø/Glimt and Stabæk, returning to the top flight after an absence of four years and one season respectively. They replaced Tromsø (after an eleven-year spell in Eliteserien) and Hønefoss (relegated after two seasons presence).

Stadiums and locations
Note: Table lists in alphabetical order.

Personnel and kits

 League table 

Relegation play-offs

The 14th-placed team, Brann, took part in a two-legged play-off against Mjøndalen, the winners of the 2014 1. divisjon promotion play-offs, to decide who would play in the 2015 Tippeligaen.

First leg

Second legMjøndalen won 4–1 on aggregate and gained promotion to the 2015 Tippeligaen; Brann were relegated to the 1. divisjon.''

Results

Season statistics

Top scorers

Hat-tricks

Notes
(H) – Home team(A) – Away team

Top assists

Discipline

Player
Most yellow cards: 9
 Anders Trondsen (Stabæk)
Most red cards: 2

 Aksel Berget Skjølsvik (Sandnes Ulf)

Club
Most yellow cards: 49  
Strømsgodset

Most red cards: 3
Sandnes Ulf

Attendances

Awards

Annual awards

Player of the Year  

The Player of the Year awarded to  
Jone Samuelsen (Odds)

Goalkeeper of the Year  

The Goalkeeper of the Year awarded to 
Ørjan Nyland (Molde)

Defender of the Year  

The Defender of the Year awarded to  
Martin Linnes (Molde)

Midfielder of the Year  

The Midfielder of the Year awarded to 
Jone Samuelsen 
(Odds)

Striker of the Year  

The Striker of the Year awarded to 
Viðar Örn Kjartansson (Vålerenga)

Manager of the Year  

The Manager of the Year awarded to 
Tor Ole Skullerud (Molde)

Young Player of the Year  

The Young Player of the Year awarded to 
Martin Ødegaard (Strømsgodset)

References

External links
Season at soccerway.com
Season at RSSSF

Eliteserien seasons
1
Norway
Norway